is a Japanese politician of the Constitutional Democratic Party of Japan (CDP), a member of the House of Representatives in the Diet (national legislature). He represents Hokkaido's 8th district. He was a member of the Democratic Party. While he joined the CDP on the day it was formed, he ran on an independent ticket in the 2017 general election.

References

External links 
 
  in Japanese.

1959 births
Living people
Politicians from Hokkaido
Hokkaido University alumni
Japanese pharmacists
Mayors of places in Hokkaido
Members of the House of Representatives (Japan)
Constitutional Democratic Party of Japan politicians
Democratic Party of Japan politicians
21st-century Japanese politicians